General vesicular transport factor p115 is a protein that in humans is encoded by the USO1 gene.

Function 

The protein encoded by this gene is a peripheral membrane protein which recycles between the cytosol and the Golgi apparatus during interphase. It is regulated by phosphorylation: dephosphorylated protein associates with the Golgi membrane and dissociates from the membrane upon phosphorylation. Ras-associated protein 1 recruits this protein to coat protein complex II (COPII) vesicles during budding from the endoplasmic reticulum (ER), where it interacts with a set of COPII vesicle-associated SNAREs to form a cis-SNARE complex that promotes targeting to the Golgi apparatus. Transport from the ER to the cis/medial Golgi compartments requires the action of this gene product, GOLGA2, and giantin in a sequential manner.

Interactions
USO1 has been shown to interact with:
 GOSR1, 
 GOSR2, 
 SCFD1, and 
 STX5.

References

Further reading

Armadillo-repeat-containing proteins